Taliya Sports Club is a Syrian professional football club based in Hama.

History 
The Taliya Sports Club was founded in 1941 in the Syrian city of Hama under the name of Al-Waqah Club. In 1971 the clubs (Al-Waqqa - Al-Ahly - Umayya) were merged into one with the name Al-Taliya Club. 

The club's biggest success was reaching the cup final in 2007, where they lost to the reigning champion Al-Karamah SC. The highest league position – 3rd place, also comes from 2007 season.

Honours

Current squad

Gallery

References

External links
 Official site
 Arab Champions' League 2007/08 – rsssf.com
Arab Champions' League 2008/09 rsssf.com

 
Football clubs in Syria
Association football clubs established in 1941
1941 establishments in Mandatory Syria